Christian Lindner (born 20 September 1959) is a German journalist. From 2004 to 2017, he was chief editor of the Rhein-Zeitung.

Life 
Lindner was born on 20 September 1959 in Kaufbeuren, Bavaria, Germany. He then went through several positions in the local editions and in the central editorial office of this newspaper. From 1992 to 1998, Lindner was the local manager of the Rhein-Zeitung'''s edition . In 1997, he became deputy chief editor and since 2004, he has been chief editor of the Rhein-Zeitung. The alleged reason given was the orientation of the Rhein-Zeitung on the Internet. Lindner became deputy chief editor at Bild am Sonntag on 1 April 2018. In a tweet from 18 July 2019, Lindner announced that he would leave Bild am Sonntag, but remain true to journalism.

 Honorary offices 
In 2013, Lindner was appointed by the Theodor Wolff Prize Board of Trustees to the jury of the Journalistenpreises der deutschen Zeitungen (German Newspapers' Journalism Prize).

 Awards 
In 1997, Deutscher Jagdverband (German hunting protection association) awarded Lindner the Journalistenpreis by Deutscher Journalisten-Verband (DJW) for its long-term series Das Jahr eines Jägers (The year of a hunter), which was published in the Westerwälder Zeitung.

In 2011 and 2013, Lindner was voted Chefredakteur des Jahres (chief editor of the year) in the category Regional/Lokal (Regional/Local'') by a specialist jury from the trade journal Medium Magazin.

References 

Living people
1959 births
People from Kaufbeuren
German journalists